Childhood and Society is a 1950 book about the social significance of childhood by the psychoanalyst Erik H. Erikson.

Summary
Erikson discusses the social significance of childhood, introducing ideas such as the eight stages of psychosocial development and the concept of an "identity crisis".

Reception
Childhood and Society was the first of Erikson's books to become popular. The critic Frederick Crews calls the work "a readable and important book extending Freud's developmental theory." The Oxford Handbook of Identity names Erikson as the seminal figure in "the developmental approach of understanding identity".

References

1950 non-fiction books
American non-fiction books
Books by Erik Erikson
Childhood
English-language books
Psychology books
Works about children